The Sainsbury Centre is an art gallery and museum located on the campus of the University of East Anglia, Norwich, England. The building, which contains a collection of world art, was one of the first major public buildings to be designed by the architects Norman Foster and Wendy Cheesman, completed in 1978. The building became grade II* listed in December 2012.

Design

The Sainsbury Centre building was opened in 1978. It was designed between 1974 and 1976 by the then relatively unknown architect Foster (now Lord Foster). According to Chris Abel, the building exemplifies Foster's early work of "a regular structure embracing all functions within a single, flexible enclosure, or 'universal space'" where "the design is all about allowing for change, internally and externally." The Sainsbury Centre also demonstrates Foster's characteristic work methods of "design development", or "integrated design". It is situated on the western edge of the university's campus, beside the River Yare, and also houses the School of World Art Studies and Museology. Foster said of the building "A building is only as good as its client and the architecture of the Sainsbury Centre is inseparable from the enlightenment and the driving force of the Sainsburys themselves and the support of the University of East Anglia."

The main building is sited on sloping, turfed ground, and consists of a large cuboid, clad steel structure. One face is almost entirely glazed, with the prefabricated skeleton clearly visible. Internally, the museum gives the impression of being one vast open space, lacking any internal divisions to interfere with the interplay of natural and artificial light. Services, lighting, toilets and maintenance access are housed in triangular towers and trusses, and between the external cladding and internal aluminium louvres.

In 1988, ten years after its opening, the entire cladding had to be replaced, the aluminum panels having deteriorated beyond repair.

By the late 1980s, the collection had outgrown its accommodation, and Foster was asked to design an extension. Rather than simply extending the existing structure as had been envisaged 15 years earlier, it was decided to look below ground. The sloping site allowed for an enlarged basement to emerge at a curved glass frontage overlooking a man-made lake (an echo of the nearby 13th century Norfolk Broads). There is little clue of the extent of the new wing, except when viewed from the position of the lake. The crescent wing was built by Anthony Hunt Associates and opened in 1991.

Robert and Lisa Sainsbury Collection
In 1973, Sir Robert Sainsbury and Lady Lisa Sainsbury donated to the university their collection of over 300 artworks and objects, which they had been accumulating since the 1930s. The collection has since increased in size to several thousand works spanning over 5,000 years of human endeavour, including pieces by Jacob Epstein, Henry Moore (numerous sculptures can be found dotted around the grounds of the university), Alberto Giacometti, and Francis Bacon, alongside art from Africa (including a 'Fang Reliquary Head' from Gabon and the Nigerian 'Head of an Oba'), Asia, North and South America, the Pacific region, medieval Europe and the ancient Mediterranean.

Filming Location
In June 2014, the centre was used for filming several scenes of the 2015 motion pictures Avengers: Age of Ultron and Ant-Man.

References

Bibliography
 Hooper, Steven (ed.), with photography by James Austin (1997). Robert and Lisa Sainsbury Collection (3 vols.). New Haven and London: Yale University Press

External links

 
 Architect Foster and Partners web page about the building

Buildings and structures completed in 1978
Museums in Norwich
Musical instrument museums
University of East Anglia
University museums in the United Kingdom
Art museums and galleries in Norfolk
Foster and Partners buildings
Art museums established in 1978
1978 establishments in England
Asian art museums in the United Kingdom